A pony is a type of small horse (Equus ferus caballus). Depending on the context, a pony may be a horse that is under an approximate or exact height at the withers, or a small horse with a specific conformation and temperament. Compared to a larger horse, a pony may have a thicker coat, mane and tail, with proportionally shorter legs, a wider barrel, heavier bone, a thicker neck and a shorter, broader head. The word pony derives from the old French poulenet, meaning foal, a young, immature horse.

Small horses and ponies were traditionally used for riding, driving and as pack beasts. During the Industrial Revolution, particularly in Great Britain, many were used as pit ponies, hauling loads of coal in the mines. In the modern era they may be kept as children's mounts, for recreational  or competitive riding or driving, or for cultural or conservation reasons.

Ponies are generally considered intelligent and friendly. They are sometimes also described as stubborn or cunning. Properly trained ponies are appropriate mounts for children who are learning to ride. Larger ponies can be ridden by adults, as ponies are unusually strong for their size. Some breeds classify an animal as either horse or pony from its pedigree and phenotype, no matter its height. A full-sized horse may sometimes be called a pony as a term of endearment.

Definition

Standard horses are 14.2 or taller. However, the term pony can be used in general (or affectionately) for any small horse, regardless of its actual size or breed. Furthermore, some horse breeds may have individuals who mature under that height but are still called horses and are allowed to compete as horses.

History

Ponies originally developed as a landrace adapted to a harsh natural environment, and were considered part of the "draft" subtype typical of Northern Europe. At one time, it was hypothesized that they may have descended from a wild "draft" subspecies of Equus ferus. Studies of mitochondrial DNA (which is passed on though the female line)  indicate that a large number of wild mares have contributed to modern domestic breeds; in contrast, studies of y-DNA (passed down the male line) suggest that there was possibly just one single male ancestor of all domesticated breeds.

Domesticated ponies of all breeds originally developed mainly from the need for a working animal that could fulfill specific local draft and transportation needs while surviving in harsh environments. The usefulness of the pony was noted by farmers who observed that a pony could outperform a draft horse on small farms.

By the 20th century, many pony breeds had Arabian and other blood added to make a more refined pony suitable for riding.

Uses

In many parts of the world ponies are used as working animals, as pack animals and for pulling various horse-drawn vehicles. They are seen in many different equestrian pursuits. Some breeds, such as the Hackney pony, are primarily used for driving, while other breeds, such as the Connemara pony and Australian Pony, are used primarily for riding. Others, such as the Welsh pony, are used for both riding and driving. There is no direct correlation between a horse's size and its inherent athletic ability.

Characteristics

Ponies are often distinguished by their phenotype, a stocky body, dense bone, round shape and well-sprung ribs. They have a short head, large eyes and small ears. In addition to being smaller than a horse, their legs are proportionately shorter. They have strong hooves and grow a heavier hair coat, seen in a thicker mane and tail as well as a particularly heavy winter coat.

Pony breeds have developed all over the world, particularly in cold and harsh climates where hardy, sturdy working animals were needed. They are remarkably strong for their size. Breeds such as the Connemara pony are recognized for their ability to carry a full-sized adult rider. Pound for pound ponies can pull and carry more weight than a horse. Draft-type ponies are able to pull loads significantly greater than their own weight, with larger ponies capable of pulling loads comparable to those pulled by full-sized draft horses, and even very small ponies are able to pull as much as 450 percent of their own weight.

Nearly all pony breeds are very hardy, easy keepers that share the ability to thrive on a more limited diet than that of a regular-sized horse, requiring half the hay for their weight as a horse, and often not needing grain at all. However, for the same reason, they are also more vulnerable to laminitis and Cushing's syndrome.  They may also have problems with hyperlipemia.

Ponies are generally considered intelligent and friendly, though sometimes they also are described as stubborn or cunning. The differences of opinion often result from an individual pony's degree of proper training. Ponies trained by inexperienced individuals, or only ridden by beginners, can turn out to be spoiled because their riders typically lack the experience base to correct bad habits. Properly trained ponies are appropriate mounts for children who are learning to ride.  Larger ponies can be ridden by adults, as ponies are usually strong for their size.

For showing purposes, ponies are often grouped into small, medium, and large sizes.

However, there are also miniature pony breeds.

Similar or similarly-named horses

Some horse breeds are not defined as ponies, even when they have some animals that measure under . This is usually due to body build, traditional uses and overall physiology. Breeds that are considered horses regardless of height include the Arabian horse, American Quarter Horse and the Morgan horse, all of which have individual members both over and under .

Many horse breeds have some pony characteristics, such as small size, a heavy coat, a thick mane or heavy bone, but are considered to be horses. In cases such as these, there can be considerable debate over whether to call certain breeds "horses" or "ponies."  However, individual breed registries usually are the arbiters of such debates, weighing the relative horse and pony characteristics of a breed. In some breeds, such as the Welsh pony, the horse-versus-pony controversy is resolved by creating separate divisions for consistently horse-sized animals, such as the "Section D" Welsh Cob.

Some horses may be pony height due to environment more than genetics. For example, the Chincoteague pony, a feral horse that lives on Assateague Island off the coast of Virginia, often matures to the height of an average small horse when raised from a foal under domesticated conditions.

Conversely, the term "pony" is occasionally used to describe horses of normal height. Non-racing horses at racetracks that are used to lead the racehorses, ponying them, are called "pony horses".

The term "pony" is also sometimes used to describe a full-sized horse in a humorous or affectionate sense.

The United States Pony Club defines "pony" to be any mount that is ridden by a member regardless of its breed or size. Persons up to 25 years old are eligible for membership, and some of the members' "ponies" actually are full-size horses.

See also

 Pony Express, mail delivery by horse-mounted couriers
 List of horse breeds, includes pony breeds
 Pony Club
 Equine nutrition
 Easy keeper
 Horse care
 Norman Thelwell, the late British artist known for his cartoons of ponies and their riders

References

Further reading 

 Budiansky, Stephen. The Nature of Horses. Free Press, 1997. 
 Siegal, Mordecai, ed. Book of Horses: A Complete Medical Reference Guide for Horses and Foals, (By members of the faculty and staff, University of California, Davis, School of Veterinary Medicine.) Harper Collins, 1996.

Types of horse